In mathematics, the Kuratowski–Ryll-Nardzewski measurable selection theorem is a result from measure theory that gives a sufficient condition for a set-valued function to have a measurable selection function.  It is named after the Polish mathematicians Kazimierz Kuratowski and Czesław Ryll-Nardzewski.

Many classical selection results follow from this theorem and it is widely used in mathematical economics and optimal control.

Statement of the theorem  

Then  has a selection that is --measurable.

See also 
Selection theorem

References 

Descriptive set theory
Theorems in functional analysis
Theorems in measure theory